The 1990–91 NBA season was the Magic's 2nd season in the National Basketball Association. In the 1990 NBA draft, the Magic selected Dennis Scott out of Georgia Tech with the fourth overall pick. After playing in the Central Division in the Eastern Conference, the Magic would move into the Western Conference and settle into the Midwest Division. The Magic continued to struggle in their second season losing their first six games. After a 3-game winning streak, they lost 16 of their next 18 games, which included seven and eight-game losing streaks. However, February would be the best month for the Magic as they won 8 out of 11 games, finishing fourth in the Midwest Division with a 31–51 record.

Point guard Scott Skiles was named Most Improved Player of the Year, averaging 17.2 points and 8.4 assists per game, while Scott averaged 15.7 points per game and led the Magic with 125 three-point field goals, while being selected to the NBA All-Rookie First Team. In addition, Terry Catledge averaged 14.6 points and 7.0 rebounds per game, while second-year guard Nick Anderson provided the team with 14.1 points and 5.5 rebounds per game, and Otis Smith contributed 13.9 points and 5.2 rebounds per game. Jerry Reynolds provided with 12.9 points per game, while Jeff Turner averaged 8.6 points and 5.1 rebounds per game, and Sam Vincent contributed 8.3 points and 4.0 assists per game.

On December 30, 1990 in a home game against the Denver Nuggets, Skiles set an NBA record of 30 assists in a single game. The Magic defeated the Nuggets, 155–116.

Draft picks

Roster

Regular season

Season standings

y – clinched division title
x – clinched playoff spot

z – clinched division title
y – clinched division title
x – clinched playoff spot

Record vs. opponents

Game log

Player statistics

Season

Awards and records
Scott Skiles – Most Improved Player
Dennis Scott – All-Rookie 1st Team

Transactions

References

External links
1990-91 Orlando Magic Statistics

Orlando Magic seasons
1990 in sports in Florida
1991 in sports in Florida